Auchy-au-Bois is a commune in the Pas-de-Calais department in a Hauts-de-France region of France.

Geography

Population

Sights
 The church of St. Gilles, dating from the seventeenth century.
 The old towers of the Château de Fromental, now farm buildings.

See also
Communes of the Pas-de-Calais department

References

External links

 Article about Fromental farm 

Communes of Pas-de-Calais